Buttle Lake is a lake on Vancouver Island in Strathcona Regional District, British Columbia, Canada. The lake is located between Campbell River and Gold River in Strathcona Provincial Park. The lake is the headwaters of the Campbell River.

History 

The lake was named after John Buttle, geologist and botanist from Kew Gardens, London, who came to the area with the Royal Engineers. They mapped the area around the lake in 1865. Buttle explored Vancouver Island as naturalist under Dr Robert Brown as part of the Vancouver Island Exploring Expedition in 1864. He discovered and mapped the lake the next year.

The raised water level coalesced Upper Campbell and Buttle Lake, raising the level of Buttle by 5 meters. Prior to the increase  of forest at low-lying areas along the shore was harvested, and in many areas not fully cleared. At times of low water, there exist mudflats with stumps remaining from the forests that formerly stood there.

Travel and Activities 

The lake is accessed via Strathcona Provincial Park which is located almost in the center of Vancouver Island. The main access to the park is via Highway 28, which connects with Gold River on the west coast of Vancouver Island. Highway 28 passes through the northern section of the park and provides access to Buttle Lake.

There are multiple campgrounds along Buttle Lake. Hiking, swimming, boating, fishing and bicycling are common activities in and nearby.

References

External links
Details at B.C. Adventure

Lakes of Vancouver Island
Nootka Land District
Alberni Valley
Strathcona Provincial Park